Giannis Stergianos-Michailidis (born 21 May 1993) is a professional Greek football player, currently playing for Doxa Drama in the Greek Superleague. He made his Superleague debut in a game against Panionios.

References

External links
Profile at guardian.co.uk
 at gr.soccerway.com

1993 births
Living people
Doxa Drama F.C. players
Super League Greece players
Greek footballers
Association football fullbacks
Footballers from Drama, Greece